The Dan River Group is a geologic group in North Carolina. It preserves fossils dating back to the Triassic period.

See also

 List of fossiliferous stratigraphic units in North Carolina

References
 

Geologic groups of North Carolina